Ulea is a Spanish municipality in the autonomous community of Murcia.

Economy 
The economy of the town is based mainly on agriculture (oranges, lemons, apricots, pears and peaches) and its subsequent packaging and export of the products.

The existing services are represented for the most part by the dependencies of the City Council and by the Public School "Santa Cruz". Although it also has Medical Office, Local Employment Center, Care Center for the elderly, Municipal Pool and Cultural Center where it is also a meeting room and pensioners club, a Public Library with an extensive bibliography and a yoga retreat.

References

External links
 Ayuntamiento de Ulea 

This article contains information from the Spanish Wikipedia article Ulea, accessed on July 15, 2008.

Municipalities in the Region of Murcia